Wendy Higgins (born May 15, 1977) is an American USA Today and NY Times bestselling author of romantic fantasy and paranormal fiction for young adults. Wendy is a voice of hybrid publishing, having been published traditionally and independently.

Personal life

Wendy Higgins (née Wendy Hornback) was born in Anchorage, Alaska. After graduating from Potomac Senior High School in Dumfries, Virginia, she attended Longwood College for three semesters. Higgins then transferred to George Mason University where she graduated with a bachelor's degree in Creative Writing, and went on to study at Radford University, where she earned a master's degree in Education.

Higgins taught 2 years of 9th and 12th grade English before becoming a full-time author. She now lives in Virginia with her children and dog Rue.

Bibliography

Standalone Works
 Flirting with Maybe: A Novella (2013) - HarperCollins
 See Me (2014) - Independent Publishing Platform
Kiss Collector HarperTeen, 2018

The Sweet Series from HarperCollins
 Sweet Evil (2012)
 Sweet Peril (2013)
 Sweet Reckoning (2014)
 Sweet Temptation (2015)

Eurona Duology from HarperCollins
 The Great Hunt (2016)
 The Great Pursuit (2017)

Unknown Trilogy, Independently Published
 Unknown (2016)

References

External links
 
 
 
 
 

1977 births
21st-century American novelists
American fantasy writers
American women novelists
American young adult novelists
Women science fiction and fantasy writers
21st-century American women writers
Women writers of young adult literature
Living people